Ernest Gordon Lewis,  (26 September 1918 – 29 December 2006), commonly known as Toby Lewis, was a New Zealand-born British colonial administrator and diplomat. He was Governor of the Falkland Islands and High Commissioner for the British Antarctic Territory from 1971 to 1975.

References 

1918 births
2006 deaths
Governors of the Falkland Islands
New Zealand diplomats
New Zealand Members of the Order of the British Empire
Companions of the Order of St Michael and St George
Commissioners of the British Antarctic Territory